The name Ardiles may refer to:

 Ardiles Joaquin dos Santos Neto, also known as Buiu (footballer, born 1980)
 Ardiles Rumbiak (born 1986), Indonesian football player
 Hengky Ardiles (born 1981), Indonesian football player
 Osvaldo Ardiles (born 1952), Argentine football player
 Osvaldo Ardiles Haay (born 1997), Indonesian football player

See also
 the Ardiles flick, also known as rainbow kick